Arbeiderungdommen ("The Worker Youth") was a Norwegian newspaper, published in Oslo.

Arbeiderungdommen was started in 1923 as an organ for the Socialist Youth League of Norway. When the Socialist Youth League of Norway merged with the Left Communist Youth League to form the Workers Youth League in 1927, Arbeiderungdommen was incorporated into Den Røde Ungdom which later changed its name to Arbeiderungdommen.

References

1927 disestablishments in Norway
1923 establishments in Norway
Defunct newspapers published in Norway
Newspapers published in Oslo
Norwegian-language newspapers
Newspapers established in 1923
Publications disestablished in 1927
Social Democratic Labour Party of Norway newspapers